Coptotelia is a moth genus of the family Depressariidae.

Species
 Coptotelia allardi Clarke, 1951
 Coptotelia bipunctalis (Warren, 1889)
 Coptotelia calidaria (Meyrick, 1921)
 Coptotelia colpodes (Walsingham, 1912)
 Coptotelia complicata Clarke, 1951
 Coptotelia cyathopoides Clarke, 1951
 Coptotelia elena Clarke, 1951
 Coptotelia fenestrella Zeller, 1863
 Coptotelia gioia Clarke, 1951
 Coptotelia margaritacea (Meyrick, 1924)
 Coptotelia nigriplaga Dognin, 1904
 Coptotelia pecten Clarke, 1951
 Coptotelia perseaphaga Clarke, 1951
 Coptotelia terminalis Clarke, 1951

References

 
Hypercalliinae
Moth genera